Western Rus' may refer to:

 western regions of Kievan Rus', including:
 Halychian Rus', an East Slavic medieval state, centered in Halych
 Volhynian Rus', an East Slavic medieval state, centered in Volhynia 
 Halych-Volhynian Rus', an East Slavic medieval state, uniting Halych and Volhynia 
 Kingdom of Rus', an East Slavic medieval kingdom (Galicia-Volhynia)
 Turovian Rus', an East Slavic medieval state, centered in Turov
 Polotskian Rus', an East Slavic medieval state, centered in Polotsk

 several Slavic historical regions, including:
 White Rus', an East Slavic historical region
 Black Rus', an East Slavic historical region
 Red Rus', an East Slavic historical region
 Carpathian Rus', a historical region inhabited mostly by Rusyns (Rusynia)

See also
 Rus' (disambiguation)
 Principality of Rus' (disambiguation)
 Grand Principality of Rus' (disambiguation)
 Ruthenia (disambiguation)
 Russia (disambiguation)